Alison Hawthorne Deming (b. 1946 Hartford, Connecticut) is an American poet, essayist and teacher, former Agnese Nelms Haury Chair in Environment and Social Justice and currently Regents Professor Emerita in Creative Writing at the University of Arizona. She received a 2015 Guggenheim Fellowship.

Life
Deming was born and grew up in Connecticut. She is a great-granddaughter of Nathaniel Hawthorne. She worked in health care for fifteen years, including a decade with Planned Parenthood. In 1983 she received an M.F.A. in Poetry from Vermont College of Fine Arts. She has also been a Wallace Stegner Fellow at Stanford University and a Fellow at the Fine Arts Work Center, Provincetown, Massachusetts. She received two fellowships from the National Endowment for the Arts. In 1990 she became Director of the University of Arizona Poetry Center, where she served until 2002, also teaching in the UA Creative Writing Program. She was Distinguished Visiting Writer at the University of Hawai’i in 1997 and has taught in many venues including the Prague Summer Program, Bread Loaf Environmental Writer's Workshop, University of Montana Environmental Writing Institute, Taos Summer Writer's Conference, Indiana University Writers' Conference and many other venues. She served as poet-in-residence at the Jacksonville (FL) Zoo and Gardens as part of the Language of Conservation Project for Poet's House. She has had residencies at the Yaddo, Djeraasi Resident Artist's Program, The Mesa Refuge, The Island Institute in Sitka, Alaska, Hawthornden International Retreat for Writers, The Hermitage Artists Retreat and the H. J. Andrews Experimental Forest among others. Her new nonfiction book "A Woven World: On Fashion, Fishermen, and the Sardine Dress" was published by Counterpoint Press in 2021.

She has taught at the University of Arizona since 1990 and was appointed Agnes Nelms Haury Chair in 2014.
  She lives in Tucson, Arizona  and Grand Manan, New Brunswick, Canada. Her daughter is the artist Lucinda Bliss.

Awards
 2015 Guggenheim Fellowship 
 2015 Essay in Best American Science and Nature Writing
 2014 Senior Fellow, Spring Creek Project, Department of Philosophy, Oregon State University
 2010 Best Essay Gold, GAMMA Awards, Magazine Association of the Southeast, essay in The Georgie Review
 2007 Essay in Best American Science and Nature Writing
 1998 Bayer Award in Science Writing, Creative Nonfiction
 1998 Finalist, PEN Center West Award for Creative Nonfiction, for The Edges of the Civilized World
 1995 Poetry Fellowship, National Endowment for the Arts
 1994 Walt Whitman Award of the Academy of American Poets selected by Gerald Stern
 1993 Pushcart Prize (nonfiction), Pushcart Press
 1992 Gertrude B. Claytor Memorial Award, Poetry Society of America, New York, NY
 1990 Poetry Fellowship, National Endowment for the Arts
 1983 Pablo Neruda Prize from Nimrod

Works
 Deming's work has been widely published and anthologized including in Ecotone, Orion, The Georgia Review, terrain.org, OnEarth, Parthenon West, Hawk and Handsaw, Sierra, Gnosis, American Poetry Review, Eleven Eleven, Western Humanities Review, The Massachusetts Review, Cutthroat, Verse and Universe: Poems on Science and Mathematics, The Norton Book of Nature Writing and Best American Science and Nature Writing.

Poetry

Essays
 A Woven World: On Fashion, Fishermen, and the Sardine Dress, Berkeley, CA, Counterpoint Press, 2021, 
 Zoologies: On Animals and the Human Spirit, Minneapolis, Milkweed Editions, 2014, 
 Writing the Sacred into the Real, Minneapolis: Milkweed Editions, Credo Series, 2001,

Anthologies Edited
 Alison Deming and Revised and expanded edition, 2011.

References

External links
 "Author's website"
 "Poet Alison Hawthorne Deming on What Nature Teaches -- If We Listen",                                           August 16, 2008, On Earth
 Interview with Deming on Words on a Wire
 "Interview: Alison Hawthorne Deming -  MFA Program Director", Adriann Ranta, Editorial Department

Writers from Hartford, Connecticut
Vermont College of Fine Arts alumni
Stanford University alumni
University of Arizona faculty
University of Hawaiʻi faculty
1946 births
Living people
Stegner Fellows